Petralia is a surname of Italian origin. People with that name include:

 Kathryn Petralia, American entrepreneur, co-founder and COO of Kabbage
 Mickey Petralia, American record producer
 Fani Palli-Petralia, Greek lawyer, New Democracy politician and a former Minister for Employment and Social Protection

See also

 Petralia  (disambiguation)

Surnames of Italian origin